Ion Zelenak (died 1958) was a Romanian footballer who played as a midfielder.

International career
Ion Zelenak played one friendly match for Romania, on 14 October 1934 under coach Alexandru Săvulescu in a 3–3 against Poland.

Honours
Chinezul Timișoara
Divizia A: 1925–26, 1926–27

References

External links
 

Year of birth missing
1958 deaths
Romanian footballers
Romania international footballers
Place of birth missing
Association football midfielders
Liga I players
Chinezul Timișoara players